Joliette is a city in Quebec, Canada.

Joliette may also refer to:

Places

Canada
Joliette (electoral district), a federal riding in Quebec
Joliette (provincial electoral district), a provincial riding in Quebec
Joliette Regional County Municipality, Quebec, a county

Other places
La Joliette, a neighbourhood of Marseilles, France
Joliette, North Dakota, an unincorporated community in the United States

Other uses
HMCS Joliette (K418), a river-class frigate that served with the Royal Canadian Navy

See also 
 Joliette station (disambiguation)
 Joliet (disambiguation)
 Juliet (disambiguation)
 Juliette (disambiguation)